Rajwinder Kaur may refer to:

 Rajwinder Kaur (field hockey)
 Rajwinder Kaur (judoka)
 Rajwinder Kaur (sprinter) (born 1980), Indian sprinter